One True Love is a 2008 Filipino romantic film directed by Mac Alejandre starring Dingdong Dantes and Marian Rivera, with Iza Calzado. The film was released in the Philippines on November 19, 2008. The movie was produced by GMA Pictures.

Plot
Migs Mijares (Dingdong Dantes) was so in love with Joy (Marian Rivera) that in less than a year of relationship, he asked for her hand in marriage. Even when Bela (Iza Calzado), the childhood sweetheart of Migs, returned from Canada and made an attempt to win him back, Migs's decision to marry his present girlfriend was resolute.
 
But early on, a tragedy struck the blissful marriage of Migs and Joy. Migs had an accident, which caused his isolated retrograde amnesia. His last memory was that of his first and ex-girlfriend, and he forgot everything about his wife. Joy did her best to bring her marriage back to normal, but Migs could not feel any emotional connection with her. Meanwhile, Bela tried her best to distance herself from her Migs, but the latter was persistent.
 
In an effort to continue to save her marriage, Joy became interfering. She always checked the whereabouts of Migs and monitored his calls. This provoked Migs to make a choice: to be with his first love. Joy made the last effort by talking to Bela but the meeting was futile. At first, Migs and Bela were happy. However, after a while, Migs started missing his wife. He became confused again, and slowly, he began to realize which girl was really his one true love.

Cast and characters

Main Cast
Marian Rivera as Joy Mejares
Dingdong Dantes as Dr. Miguel "Migs" Mejares
Iza Calzado as Bela

Supporting Cast
Bianca King as Ara Mejares
Jennica Garcia as Raya
Tessie Tomas as Julie Robles
Boots Anson-Roa as Lola
Chinggoy Alonzo as Atty. Julian Mijares
Pinky Marquez as Margarita Mijares
Sheena Halili  as Lily
Sharlene San Pedro as Sandra
Vaness del Moral as Mimi
Alex Castro as Mike

Cameo Role
Atty. Adel Tamano
Atty. Annette Gozon-Abrogar
Roselle Monteverde-Teo

Reception
The Cinema Evaluation Board of the Philippines rated the film a "B"

Performances by Dantes and Rivera was raved, but it was Calzado who received the most praise as Manila Bulletin dubs her as "pure crocodile tears". Film critic Karen A. Pagsolingan pointed out that Calzado's "eyes were expressive, and her delivery of lines impressive. There were several scenes where she rendered me speechless".
The final gross of the movie is  according to Box Office Mojo.

References

External links

One True Love: Official Website

2008 films
2000s mystery films
2008 romantic drama films
Films about amnesia
GMA Pictures films
Philippine romantic drama films
Regal Entertainment films
2000s Tagalog-language films
Films directed by Mac Alejandre